Run with the Pack is the third studio album by English supergroup Bad Company. It was released on February 21, 1976, by Island Records. The album was recorded in France using the Rolling Stones Mobile Truck in September 1975 with engineer Ron Nevison, and mixed in Los Angeles by Eddie Kramer. It was the only original Bad Company album without artwork from Hipgnosis, instead featuring artwork from Kosh.

The album peaked at No. 4 in the UK Albums Chart and No. 5 on the US Billboard 200. It has sold one million copies in the US alone.

The cover of the Coasters single "Young Blood" peaked at No. 20. The album also spawned rock radio classics "Silver, Blue and Gold", "Live for the Music", and the title track. "Silver, Blue & Gold" was never released as a single, but is one of the band's most popular compositions.

Cash Box said of "Do Right by Your Woman" that it "is an acoustic number, with some twelve-string work" and that "the harmonies are excellent, at times reminiscent of CSNY, and a low-down harmonical fill."

Classic Rock History critic Janey Roberts rated the title track as Bad Company's greatest song, saying that its energy "just simply defines what Bad Company was all about" and praising the "great intros" and "pulsating verses that built up to superman style choruses."  Classic Rock critic Malcolm Dome rated it as Bad Company's 6th best song, praising its "panache and subtlety."

The album was remastered and re-released in 1994. The vinyl album had a shiny, silver cover, but CD versions feature a simple, light grey cover. The original album cover also came as a gatefold, with a photo of the band inside, sitting around a couch near a television tuned in to a Bugs Bunny cartoon. (It was revealed in the notes in the booklet accompanying the "Deluxe 2CD Edition", that originally the TV screen showed a still of "I Love Lucy" but it was not possible to get approval for its use on the album cover, so it was changed).

Track listing

Personnel
Bad Company
Paul Rodgers – vocals, guitar, piano
Mick Ralphs – guitar, keyboards
Boz Burrell – bass
Simon Kirke – drums

Charts
Album – Billboard (United States)

Singles – Billboard (United States)

References

External links 
 Bad Company - Run with the Pack (1976) album review by William Ruhlmann, credits & releases at AllMusic
 Bad Company - Run with the Pack (1976) album releases & credits at Discogs
 Bad Company - Run with the Pack (1976, Deluxe Edition, 2017 Remaster) album to be listened as stream on Spotify

Bad Company albums
1976 albums
Swan Song Records albums
Island Records albums